The 2006 West Bengal train disaster was a fatal suspected terrorist explosion on a train travelling between New Jalpaiguri and Haldibari that occurred on 20 November 2006, when the train was in a remote part of West Bengal State, India. Five people were killed, and between fifty and twenty-five were injured, although home secretary Prasad Ranjan Ray says officials believe there may in fact be as many as sixty-six injured. Two passenger cars were damaged. The explosion was due to a still-undetermined cause, but terrorism is suspected.

References

  - Retrieved on 23 November 2006

21st-century mass murder in India
Railway accidents in 2006
Railway accidents and incidents in West Bengal
Terrorist incidents in India in 2006
Train bombings in Asia
2000s in West Bengal
Mass murder in 2006
Crime in West Bengal
November 2006 events in India